T Time is an album by saxophonist Stanley Turrentine recorded in 1995 and released by the MusicMasters label.

The newly-recorded small-group set set contains a mix of pieces from throughout the then-61-year-old saxophonist's career:
four songs from Turrentine's 1970s days on the CTI label (Don't Mess with Mister T., A Little Sweetness aka Sugar, I Haven't Got Anything Better To Do, and Impressions), a bossa from 1979 (The Island), two songs from his 1989 penultimate major label release La Place (Terrible T. and Touching), and a new original by longtime sideman Dave Stryker (Side Steppin').

Reception

AllMusic reviewer Scott Yanow stated "Modern, small-group Turrentine. He plays the horn like few others, but this is not in the style of his vintage soul stuff".

Track listing
 "Don't Mess With Mister T." (Marvin Gaye) – 6:10
 "A Little Sweetness" (Stanley Turrentine) – 6:21
 "I Haven't Got Anything Better to Do" (Lee Pockriss, Paul Vance) – 5:33
 "Impressions" (John Coltrane) – 7:56
 "Terrible T." (Turrentine, Bobby Lyle) – 4:40
 "The Island" (Ivan Lins, Vítor Martins) – 6:03
 "Touching" (Turrentine, Lyle) – 6:53
 "Side Steppin'" (Dave Stryker) – 4:51

Personnel 
Stanley Turrentine – tenor saxophone
Kenny Drew Jr. – piano, B-3 organ, keyboards
Dave Stryker – guitar
Dwayne Dolphin – acoustic bass, electric bass 
Mark Johnson – drums 
Alfredo Mojica – percussion (tracks 2 & 6)

References 

1995 albums
Stanley Turrentine albums
MusicMasters Records albums